Waynesburg is a borough in and the county seat of Greene County, Pennsylvania, United States, located about  south of Pittsburgh. Its population was 3,987 at the 2020 census.

The region around Waynesburg is underlaid with several layers of coking coal, including the Pittsburgh No. 8 seam, the Waynesburg seam, and the Sewickley (Mapletown) seam. The area is also rich with coalbed methane, which is being developed from the underlying Marcellus Shale, the largest domestic natural gas reserve. Early in the 20th century, four large gas compressing stations and a steam shovel factory were located in Waynesburg.

Waynesburg is named for General "Mad" Anthony Wayne, one of the top lieutenants of George Washington during the Revolutionary War (1776–81). The borough is the location of Waynesburg University, and it is served by the Greene County Airport.

History

In 1796, the Pennsylvania General Assembly passed legislation to create Greene County, dividing Washington County into two parts with the lower part becoming Greene County. Part of the legislation required a city to take the county seat for the section of land. They chose Waynesburg as the place for the county seat because it was in the center of the county.
Thomas Slater owned the land which is now Waynesburg. According to the Living Places website, Slater purchased the land from a Native American for a two-year-old heifer and a flint-lock rifle. In that time, land development required a patent from William Penn. The town at that time was referred to as Eden, named after his wife Elanor’s maiden name, according to the Angel Fire website. County commissioners bought the 158 acres of land from Slater for $2,376 for the purpose of building a jail, courthouse and other public buildings. The commissioners changed the name to Waynesburg, after Revolutionary War General Anthony Wayne. Despite selling the land, though, Slater remained in the area. He lived next to the Waynesburg VFW where two trailers now sit. Slater lived in his house until his death in 1815 at the age of 76.
In August 1875 construction began of the  narrow gauge Waynesburg and Washington Railroad, conceived by John Day in 1874 and chartered in 1875. Its passenger service ended in 1929, and conversion to  followed in 1944 as a wartime measure. Then the railroad was renamed the Waynesburg Secondary Railroad. Regular freight service ended on this line in 1976, though part of it still serves (irregularly) for railroad access to a coal mine.

The Waynesburg Historic District, Hanna Hall at the university, and Miller Hall are listed on the National Register of Historic Places.

Geography
Waynesburg is located northeast of the center of Greene County at  (39.897403, -80.185597). Its southern boundary follows the South Fork of Tenmile Creek, an east-flowing tributary of the Monongahela River. The borough is surrounded by Franklin Township, a separate municipality.

U.S. Route 19 passes through the center of the borough as High Street (westbound) and Greene Street (eastbound), turning on the north side of town to follow Morris Street (northbound) and Richhill Street (southbound). Pennsylvania Route 21 joins US 19 through downtown Waynesburg on High and Greene streets. PA 21 leads east  to Interstate 79 at Exit 14 and continues east another  to Uniontown.

Climate

Demographics

As of the census of 2000, there were 4,184 people, 1,619 households, and 869 families residing in the borough. The population density was 5,038.6 people per square mile (1,946.3/km²). There were 1,811 housing units at an average density of 2,180.9 per square mile (842.4/km²). The racial makeup of the borough was 96.94% White, 1.63% African American, 0.10% Native American, 0.57% Asian, 0.05% Pacific Islander, 0.17% from other races, and 0.55% from two or more races. Hispanic or Latino of any race were 0.65% of the population.

There were 1,619 households, out of which 24.1% had children under the age of 18 living with them, 38.4% were married couples living together, 11.6% had a female householder with no husband present, and 46.3% were non-families. 38.2% of all households were made up of individuals, and 16.7% had someone living alone who was 65 years of age or older. The average household size was 2.24 and the average family size was 2.99.

In the borough the population was spread out, with 18.6% under the age of 18, 24.2% from 18 to 24, 24.8% from 25 to 44, 17.8% from 45 to 64, and 14.5% who were 65 years of age or older. The median age was 30 years. For every 100 females there were 97.5 males. For every 100 females age 18 and over, there were 97.4 males.

The median income for a household in the borough was $30,990, and the median income for a family was $42,933. Males had a median income of $31,577 versus $22,458 for females. The per capita income for the borough was $15,333. About 8.0% of families and 13.0% of the population were below the poverty line, including 10.5% of those under age 18 and 11.7% of those age 65 or over.

Prisons
The SCI-Greene prison, operated by the Pennsylvania Department of Corrections, is located in Franklin Township, near Waynesburg.

A state prison site was located in Morgan Township, near Waynesburg; originally it was a juvenile prison operated by the Pennsylvania Department of Public Welfare. This became the PADOC State Correctional Institution – Waynesburg, an adult prison, in 1984. It closed in 2003, and the land was sold to Basalt Trap Rock Co.

Education
Its school district is Central Greene School District.

The Eva K. Bowlby Public Library is on Bowlby Street (originally named North Richill Street), in the former Bowlby family home. It was bequeathed by Mrs Bowlby, a prominent local citizen who died in 1957, to serve as a children's library.

Notable people
Mary Temple Bayard (1853-1916), writer, journalist
Arthur I. Boreman, first governor of West Virginia, left Waynesburg at the age of four
Todd Tamanend Clark, poet and composer, lived in Waynesburg from 1965 to 1970  
Bill George, linebacker for the Chicago Bears and the Los Angeles Rams
Greg Hopkins, Arena Football League player who played high school football in Waynesburg
Josh Koscheck, mixed martial artist
Edward Martin, Republican governor and senator for Pennsylvania
Elissa McCracken, 2012 Miss Ohio
Dave Palone, harness racing driver
Rittz, rapper on Tech N9ne's record label Strange Music
Coleman Scott, 2012 London Olympic bronze medalist in freestyle wrestling
Sarah Rush, American actress, best known in television for her work in the original Battlestar Galactica.

References

External links

Waynesburg Prosperous & Beautiful, business group

County seats in Pennsylvania
Populated places established in 1796
Boroughs in Greene County, Pennsylvania
1796 establishments in Pennsylvania